Rotla is a  long river in Trøndelag county, Norway.  The river begins at Roltdalstjønna in Meråker municipality, just north of the mountain Fongen.  It then runs through west through the Skarvan and Roltdalen National Park.  The river ends when it flows into the Nea River near Stokkan in Selbu municipality.  The Nea River then flows west for  until reaching the lake Selbusjøen at the village of Mebonden.  The river Rotla is part of the Nea-Nidelvvassdraget watershed.

See also
List of rivers in Norway
Raiders of the Lost Ark

References

Rivers of Trøndelag
Meråker
Selbu
Rivers of Norway